Berry Washington (c. 1847-May 26, 1919) was a 72 year old black man who was lynched in Milan, Georgia, in 1919. He was in jail after killing a white man who was attacking two young girls. He was taken from jail and lynched by a mob.

History
At 1:00 AM on the morning of May 24, 1919, two white men, John Dandy and Levi Evans, went into the black section of Milan. They first tried to get into the home of Emma McCollers who had two young daughters. When the family refused to open the door Dandy fired his gun. This caused the girls to flee to another house, the home of widow Emma Tisber. The two men followed and invaded the Tisber home and attempted to assault two young black girls. When the two girls attempted to hide under the porch, Dandy and Evans began ripping up the floor to get to them. Washington, a black man, attempted to defend the girls and get the men to leave. Dandy fired at Washington and after a struggle, Washington, who was 72 years old, shot and killed Dandy, "He fell with his
pistol in his right hand and a cigarette in the other, and a flask of liquor fell out of his pocket." 

Washington went uptown and woke up the chief of police, Mr. Stuckey, who sent Washington to the McRae jail at 2:00 AM May 24, 1919. There he stayed in jail until the 25th, at 12 o’clock, when a crowd of white men, led by a Baptist minister, removed Washington from the jail. To possibly hide their crimes all black residents of Milan were rounded up and ordered out of the town on the night of May 25th.  At 2:00 AM on May 26th the lynch mob hung him from a post and shot him repeatedly until his body fell in pieces from the post. White residents rioted in the city, damaging and burning many black homes. They threatened black citizens, lest they dare to speak out about the events in public.

Local authorities attempted to cover up the incident, but a local preacher, Reverend Judson Dinkins, sent a letter to Monroe Work at the Tuskegee Institute, who in turn passed the letter to John Shillady of the NAACP. When Governor of Georgia Hugh Dorsey (term 1917–1921) became aware of the incident, he offered a $1,000 reward for the arrest and conviction of the mob.  Dr. Floyd McRae offered an additional $500 reward, for a total of $1,500 ($ in ). Although the perpetrators were well known in the community, no one claimed the reward, and no one was ever charged for the murder. Washington's corpse was left there for a full day.

In September 1919, it was reported that Georgia Judge E. D. Graham ordered the city of McRae, Georgia to take action and possibly remove Sheriff Williams as a result of the lynching. It was also alleged that one of the McRae deputies was a ringleader in the killing.

Aftermath
This was not the only incident of racial violence in Georgia in 1919. There were a number of riots, some of which are listed below:
 

These race riots were one of several incidents of civil unrest that began in the so-called American Red Summer of 1919. Terrorist attacks on black communities and white oppression in over three dozen cities and counties. In most cases, white mobs attacked African American neighborhoods. In some cases, black community groups resisted the attacks, especially in Chicago and Washington DC. Most deaths occurred in rural areas during events like the Elaine Race Riot in Arkansas, where an estimated 100 to 240 black people and 5 white people were killed. Also in 1919 were the Chicago Race Riot and Washington D.C. race riot which killed 38 and 39 people respectively. Both had many more non-fatal injuries and extensive property damage reaching into the millions of dollars.

Bibliography 
Notes

References

  - Total pages: 368 
  

 - Total pages: 234  

1840s births
1919 deaths
1919 murders in the United States
Deaths by firearm in Georgia (U.S. state)
Lynching deaths in Georgia (U.S. state)
People from Dodge County, Georgia
People from Telfair County, Georgia
People murdered in Georgia (U.S. state)
1919 crimes in the United States
1919 in Christianity
1919 in Georgia (U.S. state)
1919 riots in the United States
May 1919 events
Jenkins County, Georgia
African-American history of Georgia (U.S. state)
Arson in Georgia (U.S. state)
Riots and civil disorder in Georgia (U.S. state)
White American riots in the United States
Racially motivated violence against African Americans
Red Summer
History of Georgia (U.S. state)
Crimes against police officers in the United States
Attacks on African-American churches
History of Baptists